The FIL World Luge Natural Track Championships 2001 took place in Stein an der Enns, Austria. This marked the first time the championships were held in consecutive years since the first two championships were held in 1979 and 1980.  The mixed team event was added to these championships.

Men's singles

Women's singles

Men's doubles

Mixed team

Medal table

References
Men's doubles natural track World Champions
Men's singles natural track World Champions
Women's singles natural track World Champions
Mixed teams natural track World Champions

FIL World Luge Natural Track Championships
2001 in luge
2001 in Austrian sport
Luge in Austria